El Questro Wilderness Park is a wilderness park on El Questro Station, a cattle station that diversified its pastoral operation to include tourism, located in the Kimberley region of Western Australia. It remains a working cattle station with a herd of approximately 6,000 head. In 2012 the pastoral station lessee was GPT Funds Management Pty Ltd. El Questro station operates under Crown Lease number CL207-1984 and has Land Act number LA3114/1180.

The station was first established in 1903. Will and Celia Burrell bought the cattle station in 1991 and developed it into a wilderness park tourist destination. The Burrells sold El Questro to General Property Trust in 2005. General Property Trust onsold the wilderness park to Delaware North in March 2010.

There are three resorts on El Questro: Emma Gorge (offering safari cabins), The Station (bungalows and camping) and The Homestead (luxury rooms and suites) - all operated by Delaware North of Buffalo, New York.

See also
List of ranches and stations
List of pastoral leases in Western Australia

References

Kimberley (Western Australia)
Pastoral leases in Western Australia
Stations (Australian agriculture)
1903 establishments in Australia